is a Japanese former sports shooter. He competed in the trap event at the 1960 Summer Olympics.

References

External links

1924 births
Possibly living people
Japanese male sport shooters
Olympic shooters of Japan
Shooters at the 1960 Summer Olympics
People from Yamaguchi Prefecture